William Stewart Loggie (August 10, 1850 – March 13, 1944) was a merchant and politician of the town of Chatham, New Brunswick, Canada.

Born in Burnt Church, New Brunswick, Loggie, a dynamic man, built a small empire throughout the Miramichi River area. He bought fish directly from the fishermen, and packed and exported it. As well he operated a large retail business, with hardware, clothing, footwear and grocery stores in Chatham, and general stores in smaller communities in outlying villages. Loggie was also a shipowner and bought and exported lumber.

Loggie sat as the Liberal Party of New Brunswick representative in the Legislative Assembly of New Brunswick for the riding of Northumberland from 1903 to 1904 when he resigned to run for the House of Commons of Canada in the general elections of 1904. A Liberal, he represented the riding of Northumberland from 1904 until 1917 when, as a result of the Conscription Crisis he ran for re-election as a Unionist supporting Sir Robert Borden's government. He did not run for re-election in 1921, retiring to private life.

When W. S. Loggie died in 1944, his son, J. Kerr Loggie, took over as president of W. S. Loggie and Sons. Kerr's health was failing by 1946 and his brother, Leigh Loggie, returned from the Peace River Country of Alberta where he operated a fur trading business and general store. He operated the company until his death in 1977. As Leigh was a bachelor, the business was wound down at his passing.

W. S. Loggie's three-story Victorian Mansion on Wellington Street in Chatham is now a cultural centre.

Electoral record

External links
 

1850 births
1944 deaths
Canadian businesspeople
Liberal Party of Canada MPs
Members of the House of Commons of Canada from New Brunswick
New Brunswick Liberal Association MLAs
Unionist Party (Canada) MPs
People from Miramichi, New Brunswick